Victoria Miranda (born 5 June 2000) is an Argentinian field hockey player.

Hockey career 
In 2019, Miranda was called into the senior national women's team. She competed in the team that finished fourth at the 2019 Pro League in Amstelveen.

She won a gold medal at the 2018 Youth Olympics in Buenos Aires.

References

External links

Living people
2000 births
Argentine female field hockey players
Field hockey players at the 2018 Summer Youth Olympics
Youth Olympic gold medalists for Argentina
21st-century Argentine women